This is a list of Argentine films which were released in 2016:

External links
2016 in Argentina

List of 2016 box office number-one films in Argentina

2016
Argentina